Thérèse Étienne is a 1958 French-Italian drama film directed by Denys de La Patellière, and starring James Robertson Justice, Françoise Arnoul, and Pierre Vaneck. It was based on a 1939 novel by John Knittel. The film's sets were designed by the art director Paul-Louis Boutié. It was shot at the Billancourt Studios in Paris and on location in Switzerland.

Synopsis
A young French woman marries an older businessman, but soon becomes involved with his son.

Cast
 James Robertson Justice as Anton Muller
 Françoise Arnoul as Thérèse Étienne Muller
 Pierre Vaneck as Gottfried Muller
 Guy Decomble as Rothlisberger
 Georges Chamarat as Le Président de la Cour
 François Chaumette as Le procureur
 Roger Burckhardt as Le prêtre
 Pierre Collet as L'avocat
 Léonce Corne as Le notaire
 Erika Dentzler as Hedwige

References

Bibliography
 Jean A. Gili & Aldo Tassone. Parigi-Roma: 50 anni di coproduzioni italo-francesi (1945-1995). Editrice Il castoro, 1995.

External links

1958 films
1958 drama films
French drama films
Italian drama films
1950s French-language films
Films directed by Denys de La Patellière
Films based on Swiss novels
Films based on works by John Knittel
Films set in Switzerland
Films set in the Alps
Films with screenplays by Roland Laudenbach
Films shot at Billancourt Studios
1950s French films
1950s Italian films